The Parliamentary Office for the Evaluation of Scientific and Technological Choices ( or OPECST) is responsible for informing the French Parliament of the consequences of scientific and technological choices in order to inform its decisions. It collects information, implements study programs and carries out evaluations. It plays the role of interlocutor recognized by the entire scientific community. It has thus established a partnership with the French Academy of Sciences and has a regular contact with other academies and major research organizations. Being the only parliamentary office, it is also called more briefly “Parliamentary Office” or “Office”.

Statutes 
OPECST is created by law no 83-609 of July 8, 1983, which provides that the Office must “inform Parliament of the consequences of choices of a scientific and technological nature, in order, in particular, to inform its decisions." This is the only common member in the National Assembly and the Senate.

The OPECST is made up of eighteen deputies and eighteen senators, appointed in such a way as to ensure proportional representation of the political groups. These deputies and senators are appointed by their political group and not co-opted by the members of the Office.

The Office is chaired, alternatively, by a member of one or the other assembly for a period of three years, the first vice-president belonging to the other assembly.

It has a scientific council of 24 "high-level personalities", chosen for their skills in scientific and technological questions.

Themes addressed 
The problems addressed by the OPECST are divided into five main themes:

 The power and energy policy
 The environment and natural risks
 The new technology
 The life sciences (bioethics, health, etc.) and biotechnology (GMOs, synthetic biology, etc.).
 Research and innovation policy and the science & society interface.

Certain files have been renewed for several years in a row, for example those related to nuclear energy and waste management through the regular evaluation of the National Plan for the Management of Radioactive Materials and Waste (PNGMDR).

In recent years, the Office has also been dealing with topical issues through a public hearing open to the press, which allows all the stakeholders concerned to be brought together quickly.

Mission on "nuclear security, instead of the industry and its future" 
In March 2011, OPECST, then chaired by deputy Claude Birraux, was jointly seized by the Office of the National Assembly and by the committee of economy, sustainable development and spatial planning of the Senate, following the events of Fukushima, of a study on "nuclear security, the place of the nuclear industry and its future".

During its meeting of March 30, 2011, the Office appointed two reporters responsible for this study:

 Christian Bataille (SOC., Nord), deputy.
 Bruno Sido (UMP, Haute-Marne), then first vice-president of the Office, senator.

During its first meeting on April 14, 2011, the parliamentary mission decided on a work program: open hearings to the press, trips to nuclear sites and trips abroad (Germany, Japan). Two unannounced checks, at the Paluel plant and at the Blayais plant, were also carried out.

The proposed long-term strategy would allow an optimal adjustment of each sector, and a gradual reduction, in parallel with the maturation of storage technologies which will make it possible to manage the intermittence of renewable energies without increasing CO2 emissions, the share of nuclear power in French electricity production.

The share of nuclear production would thus drop from around 75% today to “50 or 60% around 2050”, by not replacing one in two end-of-life reactors, in favor of EPR reactors. The decision to shut down a reactor would be left to ASN, whose necessary independence is underlined.

Controversy 
The independence of the OPECST on nuclear-related issues has long been questioned by environmentalists, including Michèle Rivasi, socialist related MP for Drôme from 1998 to 2002 and founder of CRIIRAD, who claimed to have had a "lot of difficulties to be admitted to sit on the Office" and declared in particular: "One cannot imagine to what extent the nuclear lobby permeates the work of the Office."

However, a national radioactive waste management plan to improve the readability and overall effectiveness of the initiatives of the public authorities and the various operators, central proposal of Michèle Rivasi's report relating to the consequences of storage of nuclear waste on health, had been implemented. In fact, following its report, a 2006 law known as the “Birraux law” created a legal framework for the establishment of a National Radioactive Materials and Waste Management Plan (PNGMDR). The first PNGMDR was released in 2007, and the second in 2010.

In 2021, physicist and engineer Sébastien Point denounced the recommendations formulated by the OPECST, then chaired by the mathematician and deputy Cédric Villani, to recognize the use of geobiology pseudoscience (not to be confused with scientific geobiology) to address certain health issues in the agricultural world, despite its nature. The physicist qualified geobiology as a "charlatan network" and "a profitable business which seems to find political relays".

Composition of the Parliamentary Office 
As of October 2021:

Notes and references

Notes

References 

French Academy of Sciences
French Parliament